Palaquium stellatum is a tree in the family Sapotaceae. The specific epithet stellatum means "star-like", referring to some of the indumentum hairs.

Description
The bark is brownish. Inflorescences bear up to five flowers. The tree's timber is heavy and strong.

Distribution and habitat
Palaquium stellatum is native to Sumatra, Peninsular Malaysia and Borneo. Its habitat is lowland mixed dipterocarp forests.

References

stellatum
Trees of Sumatra
Trees of Peninsular Malaysia
Trees of Borneo
Plants described in 1906